is a town located in Hiyama Subprefecture, Hokkaido, Japan.

As of September 2016, the town has an estimated population of 8,501, and a density of 13 persons per km². The total area is 638.67 km².

Geography
Setana is located on the northern Hiyama Subprefecture and faces the Sea of Japan. The Shiribeshi-Toshibetsu River flows through the center of the town.

The sole off-shore wind farm in Japan is at Setana, however, it only has two turbines.

Neighboring municipalities
 Hiyama Subprefecture
 Imakane
 Oshima Subprefecture
 Yakumo
 Shiribeshi Subprefecture
 Shimamaki

Climate

History
1902; Setana Village (Setana District) and Kudo Village (Kudo District) became Second Class Villages.
1906: Higashisetana Village (Setana District) and Futoro Village (Futoro District) became Second Class Villages.
1921: Setana Village became Setana Town.
1923: Kaitorima Village (Kudo District) was founded.
1953: Higashisetana Village became Higashisetana Town.
1955:
 Higashisetana Town and Futoro Village were merged to form the new town of Kitahiyama (Setana District).
 Kudo Village and Kaitorima Village were merged to form the new village of Taisei (Kudo District).
1966: Taisei Village became Taisei Town.
1987: Setana Line was abolished.
2005: Setana Town, Kitahiyama Town, and Taisei Town were merged to form the new town of Setana (Kudo District).

Sister City
  Hanford, California, United States
 The Hanford-Setana Sister City Program is symbolized by the "Bridging of Waters" seal which promotes extending international friendship. Each city participates by sending a delegate committee overseas each year. The group usually consists of prominent city citizens and a group of local high school students. Setana High School sends their entire upper class as delegates. The Setana group travels to Hanford in the winter while the Hanford group travels to Setana in the summer.

Education
 High schools
 Hokkaido Hiyamakita High School

Notable people from Setana
 Kitaseumi Hiromitsu, former sumo wrestler
 Daiju Hisateru, former sumo wrestler

References

External links

Official Website 

Towns in Hokkaido